Wolé Parks (born July 27, 1982) is an American actor, best known for his roles as Dallas Griffin in the CBS daytime soap opera As the World Turns, and as Sam Alexander in the Lifetime comedy-drama series Devious Maids. He appeared in the 8th season of The Vampire Diaries, playing the role of 'Cade' and portrays John Henry Irons in Superman & Lois.

Early life and education
Parks was born in New York City, to a Belizean mother named Lilith Parks and a Tanzanian father whom he did not meet until adulthood. He is a graduate of New York University with a B.F.A. in Fine Arts and a B.A. in Mathematics.

Career
He first joined the cast of the CBS soap opera As the World Turns on November 14, 2007 taking over the role of Dallas Griffin.

Parks guest-starred in Law & Order, its spin-off Law & Order: Criminal Intent and Gossip Girl, as well as starring in the sixth season of MTV's anthology series Undressed. In film, Parks was seen alongside Kevin Bacon in the HBO telefilm Taking Chance and with Joseph Gordon-Levitt in the 2012 film Premium Rush. In 2013, he has series regular role in the Lifetime comedy-drama Devious Maids. In the final season of The Vampire Diaries, Parks had a recurring role as Arcadius.

In May 2020, Parks was cast as "The Stranger" in the CW series Superman & Lois, later revealed to be a version of John Henry Irons from an unidentified Earth where his Superman became evil.

Personal life
Parks is an active volunteer with School on Wheels and has been tutoring students in mathematics since 2013. He is also heavily involved with AIDS/LifeCycle, a seven-day cycling tour through California to raise money in support of the fight against HIV/AIDS. Parks identifies as gay.

Driving accident
In 2006, at the age of 23, Parks accidentally killed a 25-year old graduate student while driving with a suspended license. On the evening of January 22, Parks was charged with leaving the scene of an accident. The Assistant District Attorney concluded that Parks "had the green light, was not speeding, committed no traffic infractions and did not appear intoxicated." Four hours later, Parks showed up at the 94th Precinct in Brooklyn to turn himself in. Following a lengthy investigation, Parks later pleaded guilty to a misdemeanor count of leaving the scene of an accident after causing physical injury, and received one year of probation, 250 hours of community service, and counseling.

Filmography

See also
 LGBT culture in New York City
 List of LGBT people from New York City

References

External links

American male film actors
American male soap opera actors
American male television actors
American gay actors
African-American male actors
21st-century American male actors
21st-century African-American people
LGBT African Americans
LGBT people from New York (state)
Male actors from New York City
Living people
New York University alumni
1982 births